Aline Margaret Campbell (19 November 1937 – 17 November 2007) was a New Zealand poet. Campbell was born and raised in Palmerston North, and attended Marsden Collegiate, Wellington where she studied acting. However, she discontinued her acting pursuits shortly after meeting and marrying fellow poet Alistair Te Ariki Campbell.

Personal life

Campbell grew up in Palmerston North, New Zealand and studied acting in Wellington before meeting her husband Alistair Campbell in 1958, who was also married to another New Zealand poet Fleur Adcock previously. Throughout her lifetime Meg Campbell had struggled with depression; from bipolar disorder to postpartum depression of which she eventually suffered from a nervous breakdown. In 1969 she began writing poetry at Porirua Psychiatric Hospital. However, it was not until the late 1970s and 1980s that she began to publish her work. The topic of her long term experience with depression and mental institutions are expressed through a variety of her poetry.

Work
Toward the end of her depression Meg Campbell published her first poem "Solitary confinement" in 1978 in the New Zealand Listener. However, it was not until the 1980s that she began to publish books of poetry such as The Way Back (1981) which won the PEN Best First Book Award for poetry. Meg Campbell continued to publish books of poetry up until her death in 2007. Later a collection of poems from Alistair Campbell and Meg Campbell titled It's Love, is not It? would be published in 2008. Her personal papers, including early drafts of her poems, are held at the Alexander Turnbull Library, National Library of New Zealand.

Style
Meg Campbell's poetry expresses her personal experiences and struggles often by wit and a sense of humor. It is also said that the role of mythology within her poetry speaks about gender roles and sexuality as well as domesticity. In The Oxford Companion to New Zealand Literature, it states that Campbell's poetry "can form unexpected links, between the mythic and the domestic, for instance, as in 'Maui', or the universal and psychological, as in 'Things Random' or 'Evolution'." The Cambridge Guide to Women's Writing in English can agree with The Oxford Companion to New Zealand Literature that Campbell's voice is strong.

Bibliography
 The Way Back (1981)
 A Durable Fire (1982)
 Orpheus and other poems (1990)
 The Better Part (2000)
 Resistance (2004)
 Poems Adrift (2007)
 It's Love, Isn't It? (2008)

See also
New Zealand Listener
The Cambridge Guide to Women's Writing in English

Notes

External links 
The Cambridge Guide to Women's Writing in English
  The Oxford Companion to New Zealand Literature

1937 births
2007 deaths
New Zealand women poets
People from Palmerston North
People educated at Samuel Marsden Collegiate School
20th-century New Zealand poets
20th-century New Zealand women writers
Pukerua Bay Residents